Freiburger Puppenbühne  is a puppet theatre company based in Baden-Württemberg, Germany.

Theatre companies in Germany